An income share agreement (or ISA) is a financial structure in which an individual or organization provides something of value (often a fixed amount of money) to a recipient who, in exchange, agrees to pay back a percentage of their income for a fixed number of years.

ISAs have gained prominence as an alternative to the traditional student loan system in American higher education, and a number of private companies now offer ISAs for a variety of purposes, including as a funding source for college tuition. ISAs are often considered to be less financially risky to a borrower than a traditional private student loan.

In the UK this type of agreement received final FCA (UK financial regulator) approval, under a unique regulatory framework. So far StepEx is the only firm to operate as a regulated ISA provider, underwriting the credit with funds from large UK financial institutions. CAPSLOCK are the largest users of FCA approved income share agreements, with over 200 UK adult learners enrolling on their cyber security re-training bootcamp in 2021.

Characteristics
Income share agreements are characterized by a percentage share of future income for some specified period of time. They can function like non-voting shares in a company where the individual student is treated like a company.  In the American system, this usually involves the investor transferring funds to an individual in exchange for a fixed percentage of their future income. Other features of income share agreements may include a) a fixed duration of time for the income sharing b) an income exemption where the borrower does not owe anything below a certain income, and/or c) a buyout option, where the borrower may pay some specified fee to exit the contract prior to the full duration of the term. Some ISA investors offer different terms to different students based on their predicted likelihood of success, while others offer the same terms to all students. Potential groups of investors could include for-profit companies, altruistic non-profits, alumni groups, educational institutions, and local, state, or federal governments.

History

Milton Friedman originally proposed the concept in 1955, in his essay "The Role of Government in Education", in which he argued that students might beneficially be funded through an "equity investment" such that:

In the 1970s Yale University attempted a modified form of Friedman's proposal with several cohorts of undergraduate students. At Yale, instead of making individual contracts for a fixed number of years, all members of the cohort agreed to pay back a percentage of earnings until the entire cohort's balance had been paid off. However, the system left students frustrated that they were paying more than their fair share, by being forced to make payments on behalf of peers unwilling or unable to pay back their loans.

In 2013, Oregon legislators passed a bill that would investigate Pay It Forward as a college financing scheme. The model would allow students to attend college tuition-free, and then pay a proportion of their incomes post-graduation to finance the cost of their studies. However, unlike the income share agreement model, Pay It Forward would be publicly funded, and it would offer fixed percentage repayments across all institutions.

Public debate over the Oregon plan led to renewed interest in equity-based funding models, including a prominent summit on income share agreements at the New America Foundation and a policy paper from the American Enterprise Institute. On April 9, 2014, Senator Marco Rubio announced the introduction of legislation in the US Congress that would 'broaden the use' of income share agreements.

In the United States today, ISAs are offered by some universities and by some skills training programs, such as coding boot camps.

Advantages

Proponents of ISAs argue that they provide significant benefits over existing models of college financing:

Efficient allocation of resources

Since investors have an incentive to allow students to pay lower shares of their income when they enroll in high quality, low-cost educational programs, ISAs lead to a more efficient allocation of financial resources between colleges.

Insurance and downside protection

ISAs reduce risk for students, and therefore act as an insurance policy for graduates with low earnings:

This is a non-trivial benefit, since we know, based on current studies that student loans can impact both short-term career outcomes and long term wealth. For instance, recent articles indicate that student loans make it difficult for individuals to participate in the stock market to build long term wealth:

"My money is spent servicing student loans," said Marcus Wallace, a 25-year-old waiter in Washington, D.C. Until that debt is reduced, he explained, the great stock market bull run will have to go on without him.

Lower job search costs

Research indicates that income based repayments make students' career outcomes more efficient by making the job search process less costly.

Students that need education finance the most (including low income, minority, and first generation students) also typically have limited social capital like family-based networks and career mentors that are frequently critical to success in the job market. ISAs augmented with career development provide a nice way to overcome such limitations.

Relevant laws by country

United States
The US allows its citizens to have income sharing agreements.

Common concerns

Indentured servitude
One of the most frequently cited concerns with Income Share Agreements is that they are a form of indentured servitude. Critics argue that because students owe a percentage of their income, the investor therefore own a piece of the student. For instance, Kevin Roose wrote in New York magazine that ISA companies give "young people in the post-crash economy the chance to indenture themselves to patrons in the investor class."

However, advocates of ISAs contend that since students have no legal obligation to work in a particular industry, and since it is illegal for investors to pressure them into a certain career, students are no more “indentured” than those with a student loan. In fact, someone with a traditional student loan has less choice than someone with an ISA, because the student with a loan needs to be in a career where they make at least enough income to cover their monthly payment, whereas someone with an ISA can choose to never make any money, and would never owe the investor a dime.

Uncaptured positive externalities
Since Income Share Agreements are priced based on likely economic success, critics argue that programs that are not economically viable but still valuable to society may not receive ISAs. For instance, a Masters of Social Work is an expensive degree, but social workers often are not paid very much. Therefore, investors may not offer Income Share Agreements for social workers given current tuition rates.

Discrimination
In 2014, the conservative think-tank, American Enterprise Institute (AEI) argued that there are no documented cases of discrimination based on race or gender with ISA agreements, but some worry that should ISAs become a more popular model, the potential for discrimination could increase. While there are already anti-discrimination laws in most financial markets that would likely apply to ISA investors, the question, as of now, has not been completely resolved. AEI also argued that ISAs are less discriminatory as compared to loans:

In 2022, a national education and workforce policy non-profit, Jobs for the Future (JFF) published a study on a proprietary data set of 7,639 ISA contracts from an education ISA program manager for 51 education providers. The study's findings found:

 Schools with higher shares of Black students offered roughly the same contract terms as other schools, while Black students’ monthly payments were lower than those of other students.
 Schools with higher shares of Latinx students offered the same income shares and thresholds but a slightly longer payment period, though Latinx students’ monthly payments were also lower than those of other students. 
 Schools with higher shares of female students offered slightly shorter contracts, but there was no difference in monthly payment amounts between female and male students.

Creaming
Some worry that ISAs would have the effect of "creaming" the best students and only fund elite institutions. However, ISAs should theoretically fund all economically viable programs (that is the future income of their graduates proportionately aligns with the cost of the degree), so the only way that could be true is if the vast majority of institutions are not economically viable.

Institutions That Offer Income Share Agreements 

Income Share Agreements are steadily gaining traction among professional investors, skills training programs, accredited colleges and universities, with many prominent programs offering Income Share Agreements as a part of their tuition options. Institutions offering ISAs include:

Northeastern University 
Northeastern University is a private research university located in Boston, Massachusetts. It offers both undergraduate and graduate level programs. Northeastern accepts Income Share Agreements as a means of financing for its accelerated online nursing program.

Purdue University 
Purdue University is a traditional, 4-year university offering both undergraduate and graduate level programs. Purdue offers a limited funding ISA program that allows select Sophomore, Junior, and Senior level students who need additional funding to finish their degree programs. Purdue offered this program because they saw a gap in their student financing options for students who had exhausted their other financing sources.

University of Utah 
University of Utah is a public research university offering undergraduate and graduate level courses. Their Income Share Agreement program offers students in all majors who are within 2 years of completing their degree an ISA valued between $3,000 and $10,000. Their Income Share Agreement program is designed to fill any gaps their students may have that are not filled by other forms of financial aid.

Induct 
Some private companies like induct.tech in India are also trying similar ISA model. They provide virtual classroom to students in Computer science stream and help them in their career.

See also
 Human Capital Contract

References

Education finance